Wilfred Carter (4 October 1933 – 4 August 2013) was an English footballer who played as a forward. He played in the Football League for West Bromwich Albion, Plymouth Argyle and Exeter City. Carter could play at inside and centre forward.

Carter was a prolific goalscorer and scored 5 goals in one match on 27 December 1960 for Plymouth Argyle against Charlton Athletic. Carter is second on the all-time list of goalscorers for Plymouth Argyle, scoring 134 goals in league matches and 148 goals in all matches. Carter died of cancer on 4 August 2013.

References

1933 births
2013 deaths
Sportspeople from Wednesbury
English footballers
Association football forwards
West Bromwich Albion F.C. players
Plymouth Argyle F.C. players
Exeter City F.C. players
Bath City F.C. players
English Football League players
Southern Football League players
Deaths from cancer in England